Cafe Rio, or Cafe Rio Mexican Grill, is an American fast casual restaurant chain based in Salt Lake City, with branches in Arizona, California, Colorado, Idaho, Maryland, Montana, Nevada, Utah, Virginia, Washington, and Wyoming. The company specializes in Mexican cuisine. Its menu includes appetizers, tostadas, salads, burritos, desserts, enchiladas, tacos, quesadillas, soups, and beverages. The company also provides catering services. In October 2017, the chain had 120 locations. In April 2022, it has grown to 146 locations.

History 

Cafe Rio was started in 1997 by Steve and Tricia Stanley in St. George, Utah. In December 2004, Bob and Kathleen Nilsen, Spencer K Hill, along with SKM/Apax Partners purchased the chain, which at the time had six restaurants. In 2011, Dave Gagnon took over as CEO and COO at the same time as Bob Baker was appointed President and CFO. In 2018, Steve Vaughan became CEO when Dave Gagnon retired. Previously, Mr. Vaughan was CFO. As of December 2020, Cafe Rio is operating in 135 locations across 11 states. Cafe Rio's recipes are inspired from the traditional cooking of the Rio Grande region of Northern Mexico, Southern Texas and New Mexico. Meals are cooked in each restaurant's kitchen, fresh every day. The signature dish is a sweet pork barbacoa burrito made enchilada-style. There are plans on opening 12 new locations in 2021 and converting current some existing locations to include drive-thru's.

Locations 
The company has locations in:

 Arizona
 California
 Colorado
 Idaho
 Maryland
 Montana
 Nevada
 Utah
 Virginia
 Washington
 Wyoming

Notes

References 

 

Buildings and structures in Washington County, Utah
Companies based in Utah
Restaurants in Utah
Economy of the Western United States
Regional restaurant chains in the United States
Fast-food chains of the United States
Restaurants established in 1997
Mexican restaurants in the United States
Apax Partners companies
1997 establishments in Utah